Anolis peruensis is a species of lizard in the family Dactyloidae. The species is found in Peru.

References

Anoles
Endemic fauna of Peru
Reptiles of Peru
Reptiles described in 2015
Taxa named by Omar Torres-Carvajal